Cynical Orange is a manhwa created by Yoon JiUn.

In the United States iceKunion originally held the license; Yen Press later took the license.

In the series, Hwang Hyemin, a girl with a beautiful face and "sincere" personality, receives adoration from boys and jealous hatred from other girls at her school. Hyemin hides her "cynical and dark side" and adopts "an innocent face" to attract her "secret crush" JongYon. When she discovers that JongYon does not like her, she sheds her previous persona and attacks MaHa, a "playboy."

References

Romance comics
Manhwa titles
2002 comics debuts
Yen Press titles